The 2010–11 Southern Professional Hockey League season was the seventh season of the Southern Professional Hockey League.  The season began October 21, 2010, and ended April 15, 2011, after a 56-game regular season and a six-team playoff.  The Mississippi Surge captured their first SPHL championship.

Preseason
The Augusta Riverhawks joined the SPHL, after the departure of the city's ECHL franchise two years prior.

Regular season

Final standings

‡  William B. Coffey Trophy winners
 Advanced to playoffs

Attendance

President's Cup playoffs

* indicates overtime game.

Finals
All times are local (EDT/CDT)

Awards
The SPHL All-Rookie team was announced March 24, 2011, followed by the All-SPHL teams on March 25, Defenseman of the Year on March 28, Goaltender of the Year on March 29, Rookie of the Year on March 30, Coach of the Year on March 31, and MVP on April 1.

All-SPHL selections

References

Southern Professional Hockey League seasons
South